Studio 6/6 is an art space, gallery and independent cultural venue based in Dhaka, Bangladesh. Co-founded by Bangladeshi artist-printmaker Najib Tareque, Farhana Afroz and multidisciplinary artist Taiara Farhana Tareque, the studio was launched in 2015.

Najib Tareque initially used the studio as his own. The studio is located at Mohammadpur in Dhaka city.

Programming
The studio has hosted numerous exhibitions, workshops, and events featuring artist, designers, musicians, etc. since 2016.

Selected exhibitions

References

2015 establishments in Bangladesh
Artist-run centres
Performance art venues
Performing arts venues in Bangladesh
Art galleries established in 2015